Jacksonville is a city in Pulaski County, Arkansas, United States, and a suburb of Little Rock. As of the 2010 census, the population of the city was 28,364. It is part of the Little Rock–North Little Rock–Conway Metropolitan Statistical Area with 729,135 people as of 2014.

The city is named for Nicholas Jackson, a landowner who deeded the land for the railroad right-of-way to the Cairo & Fulton Railroad in 1870. The community evolved from the settlement surrounding the railroad depot, eventually incorporating in 1941. In 1941, construction began on the Arkansas Ordnance Plant (AOP), which served as the primary facility for the development of fuses and detonators for World War II. Following the war, AOP ceased operations and the land was sold for commercial interests, including the development of the Little Rock Air Force Base in 1955. Today, portions of AOP still remain, including the Arkansas Ordnance Plant Guard House, which is on the National Register of Historic Places and the Jacksonville Museum of Military History. Despite Pulaski County being an Arkansas county that is not a "dry" county, as it allows the sales of beer and liquor, the municipal limits of Jacksonville are "moist", as it does not allow the sales of alcohol in stores, but allows the sale of alcohol in some restaurants with special permits.

Geography
Jacksonville is located at  (34.870345, −92.115164).

Demographics

2020 census

As of the 2020 United States census, there were 29,477 people, 10,333 households, and 7,025 families residing in the city.

2000 census
As of the census of 2000, there were 29,916 people, 10,890 households, and 8,004 families residing in the city. The racial makeup of the city was 64.17% White, 27.88% Black or African American, 0.50% Native American, 1.98% Asian, 0.13% Pacific Islander, 1.14% from other races, and 2.58% from two or more races. 6.24% of the population were Hispanic or Latino of any race.

There were 10,890 households, out of which 40.2% had children under the age of 18 living with them, 55.1% were married couples living together, 14.6% had a female householder with no husband present, and 26.5% were non-families. 22.0% of all households were made up of individuals, and 5.9% had someone living alone who was 65 years of age or older. The average household size was 2.64 and the average family size was 3.08.

In the city, the population was spread out, with 29.0% under the age of 18, 12.8% from 18 to 24, 33.2% from 25 to 44, 17.6% from 45 to 64, and 7.3% who were 65 years of age or older. The median age was 30 years. For every 100 females, there were 100.4 males. For every 100 females age 18 and over, there were 98.4 males.

The median income for a household in the city was $35,460, and the median income for a family was $40,381. Males had a median income of $26,708 versus $21,804 for females. The per capita income for the city was $16,369. About 11.9% of families and 14.2% of the population were below the poverty line, including 20.5% of those under age 18 and 7.9% of those age 65 or over.

Climate
The climate in this area is characterized by hot, humid summers and generally mild to cool winters.  According to the Köppen Climate Classification system, Jacksonville has a humid subtropical climate, abbreviated "Cfa" on climate maps.

Education 
Since 1927, Jacksonville had been part of the Pulaski County Special School District, one of the largest school districts in Arkansas. In the years leading up to September, 2008, parts of the Jacksonville community expressed a desire to split from the PCSSD. This measure was approved by the board of the PCSSD during that month, clearing the way, legally, for the formation of what would become Jacksonville North Pulaski School District.

In a response to a petition signed by more than 2,000 voters, the Arkansas Board of Education ordered an election to carve a new school district out of the existing Pulaski County Special School District. Jacksonville voters approved of the separation on September 16, 2014 with a vote of 3,672 for and 202 against (95% to 5%).

According to JNPSD officials, the district would be administered by the Pulaski County Special School District until its final detachment, which became effective July 1, 2016.

The district consists of six elementary schools, one middle school and one high school. The schools include Jacksonville High School, Jacksonville Middle School, Bayou Meto Elementary, Bobby G Lester Elementary, Jacksonville Elementary School, and Murrell Taylor Elementary.

A number of privately operated daycare services and church-affiliated schools are also available throughout the city. In addition, Arkansas State University-Beebe maintains a degree center at Little Rock Air Force Base for post-secondary education.

Public libraries

The Central Arkansas Library System includes the Esther Dewitt Nixon Library in Jacksonville.

Parks
In this list are the 8 parks currently located within Jacksonville.

Dupree Park
Fireman Park
Excell Park
Galloway Park
Johnson Park
Paradise Park
Northlake Park
Stagecoach Park

Attractions
In this list are the attractions that Jacksonville has to offer.

Arkansas Game and Fish Foundation Shooting Sports Complex
Bayou Meto Urban Canoe Trail
Jacksonville Guitar Center and Museum
Jacksonville Museum of Military History
Jacksonville Farmers Market
Reed’s Bridge Battlefield Heritage Park
Splash Zone

Notable people
Grady Adkins, pitcher for Chicago White Sox 1928-29
Homer Martin Adkins, governor of Arkansas from 1941 to 1945, was born in Jacksonville in 1890
Kris Allen, American Idol Season 8 winner
Lisa Blount, actress, memorable role An Officer and a Gentleman
Dan Hampton, Daniel Oliver Hampton, also known as "Danimal" (born September 19, 1957) is a retired NFL football defensive tackle who played 12 seasons for the Chicago Bears from 1979 to 1990; elected to Pro Football Hall of Fame in 2002; hosted Bears pre- and post-game shows on WGN Radio in Chicago
Demetrius Harris, tight end for NFL's Kansas City Chiefs
 Bob Johnson, Democratic member of the Arkansas House of Representatives from Jacksonville since 2015; former Pulaski County justice of the peace
Jakob Junis (born 1992), baseball pitcher for the San Francisco Giants
Clinton McDonald, defensive tackle for NFL's Tampa Bay Buccaneers, formerly of Seattle Seahawks, Super Bowl XLVIII champion; played college football at Memphis
Glen Rice, NBA champion in 2000
Robert Thomas, Robert Lee Thomas, IV (born December 1, 1974) was an NFL football fullback; played college football at Henderson State University and then for the Dallas Cowboys, as the lead blocker for Emmitt Smith

References

External links
City of Jacksonville official website
Jacksonville Chamber of Commerce
Jacksonville history page
The Leader, Jacksonville, northern Pulaski County's and Lonoke County's largest local newspaper
The Jacksonville Patriot, a weekly newspaper published on Wednesdays

 
Cities in Pulaski County, Arkansas
Cities in Little Rock–North Little Rock–Conway metropolitan area
1870 establishments in Arkansas
Populated places established in 1870
Cities in Arkansas